Melensk is a rural locality (a selo) and the administrative center of Melenskoye Rural Settlement, Starodubsky District, Bryansk Oblast, Russia. The population was 996 as of 2010. There are 7 streets.

Geography 
Melensk is located 15 km northeast of Starodub (the district's administrative centre) by road. Savenki is the nearest rural locality.

References 

Rural localities in Starodubsky District